"Teenage Talk" is a song written and performed by American art rock musician St. Vincent, released digitally on April 7, 2015.

Promotion and release 
St. Vincent initially composed the song for inclusion on her eponymous album released in 2014, but the song did not make the album's final track listing. A snippet of the song was used prior to its official release during the fourth season of the HBO television series Girls, in the episode "Tad & Loreen & Avi & Shanaz". St. Vincent performed the song live for the first time on April 6, 2015 on The Tonight Show Starring Jimmy Fallon; and the song was officially released via iTunes on April 7.

Critical reception 
The song has received positive reviews. Sharan Shetty of Slate called the song "wistful" and "a pensive coming-of-age tune". Chris DeVille of Stereogum also praised the song, further stating that it is "more moody and straightforward" than St. Vincent's previous work.

Personnel 
Credits adapted from Tidal.
 Annie Clark – songwriting, vocals, guitar
 McKenzie Smith – drums
 Bobby Sparks – synthesizer
 Daniel Mintseris – keyboards, harpsichord
 John Congleton – production

References 

2015 songs
2015 singles
Loma Vista Recordings singles
St. Vincent (musician) songs
Songs written by St. Vincent (musician)